Michael Ford (born August 4, 1995) is an American football cornerback for the Cleveland Browns of the National Football League (NFL). He played college football at Southeast Missouri State.

Early life and high school
Ford was born and grew up in Alton, Illinois and attended Marquette Catholic High School, where he played both running back and defensive back for the Explorers football team. As a senior, Ford was named first-team all-conference on both offense and defense and All-State at running back after rushing for 1,614 yards and 28 touchdowns, scoring an additional five touchdowns on returns, and recording 69 tackles with two fumble recoveries and three interceptions on defense.

College career
Ford spent five seasons at Southeast Missouri State University, redshirting his freshman season and playing wide receiver as a redshirt freshman. He was moved to defensive back at the beginning of his redshirt freshman season. As a redshirt sophomore, his first season as a starter, Ford made 44 tackles and had five interceptions and seven pass breakups and was named second-team All-Ohio Valley Conference. As a redshirt senior, Ford made 32 tackles with two sacks, an interception and 14 passes broken up.

Professional career

Detroit Lions
Ford signed with the Detroit Lions as an undrafted free agent on April 28, 2018. He failed to make the active roster out of training camp and was subsequently re-signed by the Lions to the team's practice squad on September 2, 2018. Ford was promoted to the Lions' active roster on November 14, 2018, after offensive guard T. J. Lang was placed on injured reserve. Ford made his NFL debut on November 18, 2018, when he started at cornerback and played on special teams in a 20–19 win over the Carolina Panthers, recording two tackles. In his rookie season, Ford played in seven games (four starts) with 25 tackles.

Ford played in 15 games with two starts during the 2019 season, recording 12 tackles and two passes defended. He was assigned a one-year tender with the Lions as an exclusive rights free agent on March 18, 2020. He signed the tender on April 21, 2020. He was placed on injured reserve on September 6, 2020. He was activated on October 24.

Ford signed a contract extension with the Lions on March 8, 2021. On August 30, 2021, Ford was waived by the Lions.

Denver Broncos
On September 1, 2021, Ford was claimed off waivers by the Denver Broncos. He was placed on injured reserve on October 16, 2021. He was activated on November 6.

Atlanta Falcons
On April 8, 2022, Ford signed a contract with the Atlanta Falcons.

Cleveland Browns
On March 20th, 2023, it was announced that Ford would be signing a contract with the Cleveland Browns.

References

External links
Detroit Lions bio
Southeast Missouri State Redhawks bio

1995 births
Living people
American football cornerbacks
Atlanta Falcons players
Denver Broncos players
Detroit Lions players
People from Alton, Illinois
Players of American football from Illinois
Southeast Missouri State Redhawks football players
Sportspeople from Greater St. Louis